Kampong Putat is a village in the south-east of Brunei-Muara District, Brunei. The population was 364 in 2016. It is one of the villages within Mukim Lumapas.

Facilities 
Putat Primary School is the village's primary school, whereas Putat Religious School is the school for the country's Islamic religious primary education.

The village mosque is Kampong Putat Mosque; it was inaugurated on 21 October 1983. The mosque can accommodate 120 worshippers.

Notes

References 

Putat